Bruno Gonzato (born 20 March 1944) is a retired Italian track cyclist. In 1967 he won the tandem events at the national and World Championships, together with Dino Verzini; they also finished second at the 1969 Italian Championships.

References

1944 births
Living people
Italian male cyclists
People from Schio
Cyclists from the Province of Vicenza